The 2019 Catalan general strike, also known as 18-O, was a general strike held by Catalan separatists on 18 October 2019, on the fifth night of the 2019 protests following the verdict against Catalonia independence leaders for their participation in a referendum on independence two years earlier.

Strikes for political reasons are not allowed by Spanish law. The main labor unions in the country, UGT and CCOO, did not participate.

References

Further reading

External links 

General strike
2019 labor disputes and strikes
2019 protests
General strike, 2019
General strikes
October 2019 events in Spain
Protests in Catalonia